Aarambha is a 2015 Indian Kannada feature film written and directed by S. Abhi Hanakere, making his directorial debut. Gurukiran scored the film's background music and to its soundtrack. The teasers of the film were first released on YouTube and went viral creating a controversy over its alleged sexual content. It was nominated for the Limca Book of Records for the world's first 'Ulta' (Reverse) song.

Cast
 Mithun Prakash  as Sundra
 Abhirami as Sangeetha
 Abhiraj as Shivaramanna
 Rasagavala Narayan as Kunta Bora
 Bellary Raghavendra as Bhava
 Raajegowda as Madve Prakasha
 Jeetu Chandra as Yogi
 Baby Hasini as Varsha
 Master Prithvi as Prithvi

Soundtrack

References

2015 films
Films scored by Gurukiran
2010s Kannada-language films